James Carlin Bradley (March 8, 1933 – August 12, 2015) was an American football coach.  He served as the head football coach at New Mexico State University from 1973 to 1977, compiling a record of 23–31–1.  Bradley played college football at New Mexico State from 1951 to 1954, when the school was known as New Mexico College of Agriculture and Mechanic Arts.  He was the head football coach at Mayfield High School in Las Cruces, New Mexico from 1965 to 1972.  Bradley was the head football coach at Roswell High School in Roswell, New Mexico from 1980 to 1993 before he turned to Mayfield High School, where he was again head football coach from 1994 until his retirement in 2005.  Bradley was born on 
March 8, 1933, in Las Cruces.  He died in his hometown on August 12, 2015.

Head coaching record

College football

References

1932 births
2015 deaths
Sportspeople from Las Cruces, New Mexico
Players of American football from New Mexico
New Mexico State Aggies football players
Coaches of American football from New Mexico
High school football coaches in New Mexico
New Mexico State Aggies football coaches
Baseball coaches from New Mexico
High school baseball coaches in the United States